Abigail "Abbey" Guthrie is a New Zealand former tennis player. On the Junior Circuit, she peaked at No. 360 in 2008. She and partner Kristi Boxx won two doubles titles on the ITF Women's Circuit in 2013.

Career
Guthrie competed at the Auckland Open in the summer of 2012/2013. She also made her debut for the New Zealand Fed Cup team in 2013. She holds a 9–1 record in competition after the 2014 Asia/Oceania Group Round Robin Tournament in Astana, Kazakhstan. In 2014, again as a wildcard, she and partner Sacha Jones defeated second seeds Marina Erakovic and Cara Black in the first round.

ITF Circuit finals

Doubles: 5 (2–3)

References

External links
 
 
 

Living people
New Zealand female tennis players
1990 births
21st-century New Zealand women